PP-19 Rawalpindi-XIII is a Constituency of Provincial Assembly of Punjab.

2008—2013: PP-14 (Rawalpindi-XIV)

2013—2018: PP-19 (Rawalpindi-XIV)
General elections were held on 11 May 2013. Raja Abdul Hanif won this seat with 36,852 votes.

All candidates receiving over 1,000 votes are listed here.

2018—2023 PP-19 (Rawalpindi-XIV)
From 2018 PP-14 (Rawalpindi-XIV) became PP-19 (Rawalpindi-XIV) with some changes has follow (a) Taxila Tehsil excluding Wah Cantonment and (b) Adyala Qanungo Halqa of Rawalpindi Tehsil of Rawalpindi District.

General elections are scheduled to be held on 25 July 2018.

See also
 PP-18 Rawalpindi-XII
 PP-20 Rawalpindi-XIV

References

External links
 Election commission Pakistan's official website
 Awazoday.com results
 Official website of Government of Punjab

R